Air South was an airline from the United States. Founded as Nationwide Airlines Southeast in 1969, the company had its headquarters in St. Simons, Georgia. Out of its base at Atlanta Municipal Airport, Air South operated regional scheduled passenger flights within the southeastern USA, using a small fleet of Fairchild F-27 and Martin 4-0-4 aircraft, as well as the Beechcraft Model 99.

In 1975, Air South was acquired by Florida Airlines and became a wholly owned subsidiary, along with Shawnee Airlines. Over the following years, Air South continued flight operations under its own branding. As a consequence of the Airline Deregulation Act, it was eventually shut down in 1978.

Route network
In the early 1970s, Air South offered a network of domestic flights to the following destinations:

Accidents and incidents
On 6 July 1969, the twelve passengers and two pilots of Air South Flight 168 died when the aircraft, a Beechcraft Model 99 (registered N844NS), crashed 10 kilometers northwest of Monroe, Georgia at 21:22 local time. Investigation into the accident revealed that the airplane had been at cruise level during a flight from Atlanta to Greenville/Spartanburg in South Carolina, when it went into an unwanted high speed nose-down dive. Because of the extreme pulling forces when they tried to regain control, both pilots were likely incapacitated so that the plane couldn't be maneuvered anymore.
On 31 March 1974, another Air South Beech 99 (registered N848NS) was destroyed when a fire broke out during taxiing at Malcolm McKinnon Airport. The two pilots and both passengers who planned to fly to Atlanta escaped before the airplane was engulfed by the flames.

Fleet
 3 Fairchild F-27 (N2704J, N2705J, N2706J) 
 1 Martin 4-0-4 (N258D)

See also
 List of defunct airlines of the United States

References

Defunct airlines of the United States
Airlines established in 1969
Airlines disestablished in 1978
1975 mergers and acquisitions
1969 establishments in Georgia (U.S. state)
1978 disestablishments in Georgia (U.S. state)
American companies established in 1969
American companies disestablished in 1978
Airlines based in Georgia (U.S. state)